The Siam Free Press was an English-language daily newspaper in Thailand founded in 1891 by Mr. John Joseph Lillie. The Siam Free Press was preceded by The Siam Mercantile Gazette. Due to a hostile attitude towards the Siamese Government and the Monarchy taken by the Siam Free Press, Mr. J.J. Lillie was expelled from the country by order of King Chulalongkorn by a decree dated 12 March 1898. The newspaper was then sold by public auction and bought by Mr. Chalant, a Frenchman.  In June 1901, the editor of the Siam Free Press was Mr. Michael O'Leary Dempsey. 

Having been bought by a new company, the Siam Free Press altered its name to the Bangkok Daily Mail at the beginning of January 1910.

See also 
Timeline of English-language newspapers published in Thailand
List of online newspaper archives - Thailand

References

External links 
 
 

Defunct newspapers published in Thailand
English-language newspapers published in Asia
English-language newspapers published in Thailand
Newspapers established in 1891
Mass media in Bangkok